The Long Dark Tea-Time of the Soul is an Above the Title Productions radio adaptation, dramatised by Dirk Maggs and John Langdon of Douglas Adams's The Long Dark Tea-Time of the Soul. Starring Harry Enfield, Peter Davison, John Fortune and Stephen Moore, it started broadcasting on 2 October 2008 on BBC Radio 4.

The title is a quotation from the Adams novel Life, The Universe and Everything, where it says of the immortally annoyed Wowbagger:

Changes between the novel and the radio adaptation

In adapting the story for six half-hour episodes, Dirk Maggs rescheduled the novel's convoluted plot:

The adaptation is an inverted detective story, shuffling the importance of characters: elevating the Draycotts, turning Neil Sharp into Kate Schechter's landlord and former Pugilism and the Third Autistic Cuckoo member with the now returned Richard McDuff.  Cleaner Elena is inadvertently kidnapped by Nobby the Pawnbroker, after the battle with a ravenous  fridge.

On the audio trailer, Susan Way sells Way Forward Technologies to Sirius Cybernetics, Richard McDuff  is detained by the Vogon catchphrase "resistance is useless", and the I-Ching Calculator has the 'Guide activation' sound, and is obtained from Nobby.

Examples of updating to bring the story into the 21st century (the book was written in the 1980s) include the explosion now being at Heathrow Terminal 5 (with a new joke about lost luggage), this now being explained as "freak indoor Global Warming", various price increases, the introduction of mobile phones, e.g. text messages replacing telegrams, a discussion about only audio purists still using gramophones and the removal of American Kate's frustration at the unavailability of pizza delivery in the UK (now thankfully ancient history).

Kate awakes earlier in the hospital and sees Mr Rag taking away Thor and the soft drinks machine, and when she visits the Woodshead clinic she mentions Thor directly, rather than dropping many hints.

When Dirk meets Sally Mills, he does not steal the book, as it proffered instead. Sally also remarks that the I-Ching calculator allows Dirk a way around obeying The Great Zaganza prediction that "everything you decide today will be wrong".

Episode 4 contains a telephone conversation where Richard MacDuff explains to Dirk that the motherboard of the I-Ching calculator was rubbish and is better put to use as an ultimate talking multi-media hand-held device.  Hitchhiker's sound effects are used  (as in the first series visit to the Mothership) and there is also a potentially familiar Sirius Cybernetics functionary.

In addition, the double-bass player's obvious question is changed from "I bet you wished you played the piccolo" to "how do you get it under your chin?", and Dirk forgets to ask Kate to phone him "before doing anything impossible".

Episodes
 Aired 2 October 2008: Dirk Gently loses a secretary and Odin sells his soul. 
 Aired 9 October 2008: Inspector Gilks makes a discovery and Dirk breaks a nose. 
 Aired 16 October 2008: Dirk buys a nifty gadget and Kate visits an iffy clinic. 
 Aired 23 October 2008: Thor drops a Clanger in Sharp's Flat. 
 Aired 30 October 2008: Dirk outwits an Eagle and the Draycotts find an eager nitwit  
 Aired 6 November 2008: Thor succeeds in losing his temper and Dirk fails to save himself

Cast

The returning characters are:

 Richard MacDuff - Billy Boyd
 Detective Sergeant Gilks - Jim Carter
 Janice Pearce - Olivia Colman
 Dirk Gently - Harry Enfield
 Constable Luke, RAF Pilot 1 - Wayne Forester

New characters:

 Nurse Sally Mills - Morwenna Banks
 Simon Draycott - Peter Davison
 Thor - Rupert Degas
 Nobby Paxton - Michael Fenton Stevens
 Dr Standish - John Fortune
 Geoff Anstey, Bates - Jon Glover
 Elena - Sally Grace
 Mysterious Vagrant, Vagrant King, Green Hairy Monster, Viking Announcer - Philip Jackson
 Kate Schechter - Laurel Lefkow
 Viking Announcer - Gary Martin
 Odin, Sirius Cybernetics functionary - Stephen Moore
 Neil Sharp, RAF Pilot 2 - Philip Pope
 Cynthia Draycott - Jan Ravens
 Toe Rag -  Michael Roberts
 Tsuliwaensis - Susan Sheridan
 Sarah Montague - Sarah Montague
 Announcer - John Marsh

Production

 Music composer - Philip Pope
 Executive Producer - Sioned Wiliam
 Producers  - Jo Wheeler and Dirk Maggs

Awards
The adaptation of The Long Dark Tea-Time of the Soul won The Comedy.co.uk Award for "Best British Radio Sitcom of 2008".

References

External links
 audio trailer.

BBC Radio comedy programmes
British radio dramas
Dirk Gently
2008 radio programme debuts